The German Embassy in Wellington (German: Deutsche Botschaft Wellington) is Germany's diplomatic mission to New Zealand. It is located at 90–92 Hobson Street, Thorndon, Wellington, New Zealand. The German ambassador to New Zealand has been Stefan Krawielicki since 2019.

See also
 Embassy of New Zealand, Berlin

References

External links 
 German Embassy in Wellington, New Zealand

Wellington
Germany
Germany–New Zealand relations